The Kukenarup Memorial is a memorial  west of Ravensthorpe, Western Australia that commemorates the killing of many Noongar people following the death of John Dunn, whose family had taken out a pastoral lease in the 1870s. Reports of the incidents vary. The Memorial to the historical incident was opened in May 2015 in the region. Accounts agree that John Dunn was killed in 1880. Yandawalla (Yungala) was arrested and charged with the crime. Dartaban (Dartemera; "Jumbo") was also involved, and was a witness in the trial of Yandawalla (1881). Yandawalla was acquitted of the murder of John Dunn. Reprisal killings of a number of Noongar people occurred, seemingly both prior to and following that acquittal.
John Dunn's grave is at Cocanarup Homestead.

There is a plaque, display board and boards along a walk trail with quotes from various Noongar community members and families at the Memorial.

References

Other sources
Brockway, Marian "The Dunns of Cocanarup", Journal of the Royal Western Australian Historical Society (Inc.) vol 11, Part 4.
Brown, H and Scott K. Kayang and Me, Fremantle Arts Centre Press, 2005, pp. 64–73
Eades, A and Roberts, P Report on Documentation of Research into Aboriginal Involvement in the South-west of Western Australia. Community Consultation for the Seaman Land Enquiry (unpublished). 1984.
Forrest, Roni Gray Kukenarup – Two Stories: A Report on historical accounts of a Massacre site at Cocanarup near Ravensthorpe W.A.
Forrest R & Crowe, S Yarra-mo-up: Place of the tall Yate Trees: A Noongar Social History of the Jerramungup Region. Report prepared for the Australian Heritage Commission and the Heritage Council of Western Australia
Southern Australian Register (Adelaide, SA: 1839-1900, 1881, p. 6)
Sunday Times, Perth WA: 1902-1954, Sunday 20 May 1928 p. 7; Thursday 2 February 1939, p. 77
The Inquirer and Commercial News (Perth, WA 1855-1901, Wednesday, November 1881, p. 2
The West Australian (Perth, WA 1879-1954, Tuesday 13 April 1880, page 3; Tuesday 27 April 1880, pp. 2–3; Friday 28 October 1881, page 3; Tuesday 30 May 1882 p. 3; Saturday 26 September 1885, p. 5; Tuesday 13 April, p. 3; Tuesday 27 April, pp. 2–3; Friday 28 October 1881 p. 3; Saturday 26 September 1885
Western Mail (Perth, WA : 1885 - 1954), Thursday 17 October 1935, page 8; Thursday 2 February 1939, p. 77.
Thomas, G (no date) Cocanarup Homestead – Ravensthorpe. Leaflet at Ravensthorpe Museum.

Monuments and memorials in Western Australia

Noongar
Massacres of Indigenous Australians